David Ben-Besht (born 1950) is a general in the Israel Defense Forces. Until 2007 he was commander of the Israeli Navy.

Biography
David Ben-Besht was born in Israel. He received a B.A. in Economics and Business Management from the University of Haifa and studied at the United States Marine Corps College for a year in the early 1970s.

Naval career
Ben-Besht began his military career as a draftee in 1970, but then volunteered to attend the naval officer's course.  Through the 1970s he commanded a number of vessels including a Saar 2 and a Saar 4 missile boat.  During the 1980s he moved into the area naval instructional, and from there he continued to advance up the chain of command, becoming the Israeli Navy's Chief of Staff in 2002 and commander in September 2004. 

As Naval Commander, Ben-Besht dealt with Palestinian arms smugglers moving equipment by boat from Egypt into the Gaza Strip.

References

1950 births
Living people
Israeli Navy generals
University of Haifa alumni